Givira tristis is a moth in the family Cossidae first described by Francis Walker in 1856. The type location is given as "Patria ?", but it is not clear where this is.

References

Givira
Moths described in 1856